Christian Quéré (30 January 1955 – 2006) was a French professional footballer who played as a defender.

Career 
Quéré was a youth product of Entente BFN. He joined Paris Saint-Germain in 1972, at the age of 17. With PSG, he achieved two successive promotions to bring the club back to the Division 1, making a total of 9 appearances across all competitions along the way. 

Quéré returned to Entente BFN before the end of his career, and even captained the side. It was renamed CS Fontainebleau in 1978. He retired in 1983.

Personal life and death 

Quéré went to live in Versailles in the Île-de-France region after retiring from football. He died in 2006.

Notes

References

External links 
 

1955 births
Date of death unknown
2006 deaths
Footballers from Brittany
Association football defenders
French footballers
RCP Fontainebleau players
Paris Saint-Germain F.C. players
French Division 3 (1971–1993) players
Ligue 2 players
Ligue 1 players
Entente Bagneaux-Fontainebleau-Nemours players
Sportspeople from Finistère